The Women's World Chess Championship 2018 was a knock-out tournament to crown a new women's world champion in chess. It was the second world championship held in 2018, after Ju Wenjun had defeated Tan Zhongyi to win the title in May 2018. The tournament was played as a 64-player knockout type from 2 to 23 November in Khanty-Mansiysk, Russia.

Ju Wenjun won the tournament, and so retained the Women's World Championship.

The remaining three semi-finalists qualified to the 2019 Candidates Tournament, which decided the challenger for the 2020 World Championship.

Organization

Schedule
The schedule of the tournament:
 November 2: Opening ceremony
 November 3–5: Round 1
 November 6–8: Round 2
 November 9–11: Round 3
 November 12–14: Round 4 (quarter-finals)
 November 15–17: Round 5 (semi-finals) 
 November 18: Rest day 
 November 19–23: Round 6 (final) 
 November 23: Closing ceremony

Prize fund
The total prize fund was $450,000.

Regulations
The time control was 90 minutes for the first 40 moves, and then 30 minutes for the rest of the game; plus a 30-second increment per move starting from move 1.

In the event of a tie after the regular games, the following tie breaks were used, in order:
 Two tie break games at a time limit of 25 minutes plus 10 second increment per move;
 Two tie break games at a time limit of 10 minutes plus 10 second increment per move;
 Two tie break games at a time limit of 5 minutes plus 3 second increment per move;
 Armageddon game, at a time limit of 5 minutes for white, and 4 minutes for black, plus 3 seconds per move from move 61; with white having to win and black having to draw or win.

Players
The 64 participating players are:

Format is player name, FIDE title, current Elo (October 2018), qualification path (see below). The winner's name is shaded.

  Ju Wenjun, GM, 2561 (R)
  Humpy Koneru, GM, 2557 (PN)
  Kateryna Lagno, GM, 2556 (E17)
  Anna Muzychuk, GM, 2555 (WC)
  Alexandra Kosteniuk, GM, 2551 (WC)
  Aleksandra Goryachkina, GM, 2536 (E16)
  Mariya Muzychuk, GM, 2533 (E17)
  Tan Zhongyi, GM, 2527 (WC)
  Valentina Gunina, GM, 2525 (R)
  Elisabeth Paehtz, IM, 2513 (E16)
  Nana Dzagnidze, GM, 2509 (E16)
  Dronavalli Harika, GM, 2500 (WC)
  Antoaneta Stefanova, GM, 2490 (E16)
  Natalija Pogonina, WGM, 2485 (E17)
  Zhansaya Abdumalik, IM, 2482 (J17)
  Nino Batsiashvili, GM, 2482 (PN)
  Olga Girya, WGM, 2479 (R)
  Zhao Xue, GM, 2478 (R)
  Lela Javakhishvili, IM, 2475 (E16)
  Dinara Saduakassova, IM, 2470 (J16)
  Bela Khotenashvili, GM, 2469 (E16)
  Lei Tingjie, GM, 2468 (R)
  Monika Socko, GM, 2451 (E17)
  Anna Ushenina, GM, 2451 (E16)
  Alina Kashlinskaya, IM, 2447 (E17)
  Ekaterina Atalik, IM, 2445 (E16)
  Alisa Galliamova, IM, 2432 (E17)
  Ni Shiqun, WGM, 2427 (Z3.5)
  Anastasia Bodnaruk, IM, 2423 (E16)
  Hoang Thanh Trang, GM, 2423 (E17)
  Jolanta Zawadzka, WGM, 2421 (E16)
  Irina Krush, GM, 2417 (Z2.1)
  Inna Gaponenko, IM, 2409 (E17)
  Marina Nechaeva, IM, 2409 (E17)
  Elina Danielian, GM, 2409 (E17)
  Sabrina Vega, IM, 2404 (E16)
  Natalia Zhukova, GM, 2403 (E17)
  Guliskhan Nakhbayeva, WGM, 2394 (AS17)
  Deysi Cori, WGM, 2391 (AM16)
  Gulrukhbegim Tokhirjonova, WGM, 2385 (Z3.4)
  Lilit Mkrtchian, IM, 2384 (E16)
  Yuliya Shvayger, IM, 2375 (E16)
  Anita Gara, IM, 2370 (E17)
  Vo Thi Kim Phung, WGM, 2368 (Z3.3)
  Ana Matnadze, IM, 2362 (E16)
  Zhu Jin'er, WIM, 2360 (Z3.5)
  Carolina Luján, IM, 2359 (Z2.5)
  Zhai Mo, WGM, 2351 (Z3.5)
  Ketevan Arakhamia-Grant, GM, 2345 (E16)
  Padmini Rout, IM, 2338 (Z3.7)
  Bhakti Kulkarni, CM, 2314 (AS16)
  Sabina-Francesca Foisor, WGM, 2311 (Z2.1)
  Sopiko Khukhashvili, IM, 2301 (E16)
  Yerisbel Miranda Llanes, WIM, 2239 (AM17)
  Mobina Alinasab, WIM, 2205 (Z3.1)
  Ingrid Aliaga Fernández, WIM, 2194 (AM17)
  Sun Fanghui, WIM, 2183 (Z3.5)
  Shahenda Wafa, WGM, 2148 (AF)
  Maili-Jade Ouellet, WIM, 2122 (Z2.2)
  Danitza Vázquez, WIM, 2086 (Z2.3)
  Rani Hamid, WIM, 1909 (Z3.2)
  Jesse Nikki February, WIM, 1893 (AF)
  Hayat Toubal, WIM, 1852 (AF)
  Kathryn Hardegen, WFM, 1832 (Z3.6)

Qualification paths 

WC: Semi-finalists of the Women's World Chess Championship 2017
J16 and J17: World Junior Champions 2016 and 2017
R: Rating
E16 and E17: European Individual Championships 2016 and 2017
AM16 and AM17: American Continental Chess Championship 2016 and 2017

AS16 and AS17: Asian Chess Championship 2016 and 2017
AF: African Chess Championship 2017
Z2.1, Z2.2, Z2.3, Z2.4, Z2.5, Z3.1, Z3.2, Z3.3, Z3.4, Z3.5, Z3.6, Z3.7: Zonal tournaments
PN: FIDE President nominee

Results

Final match

The final is the only match of the tournament which consists of four classical games. Those are played on consecutive days with a rest-day between the semi-final tie-breaks and match 1. Eventual tie-breaks are scheduled to 23 November, in the same manner as the whole tournament (two rapid games of 25+10, i.e. 25 minutes for the whole game plus 10 seconds increment, the two rapid games of 10+10, two blitz games of 5+3 and an armageddon decider).

Top seed Ju Wenjun, the reigning women's world champion and current women's rapid world champion, advanced to the final without playing a tie-break. Her opponent Kateryna Lagno played three tie-breaks including one armageddon game against Natalia Pogonina in the third round.

Before the final both had played each other five times at classical time control with all games ending in a draw.

{| class="wikitable" style="text-align:center"
|+Women's World Chess Championship 2018 Final
|-
! colspan=3| !! colspan=4|Classical games !! colspan=4|Tie-breaks !! rowspan=2 | Total
|- 
! Seed !! Player !! Rating  !! 1 !! 2 !! 3 !! 4 !! R1 !! R2 !! R3 !! R4
|-
| 1 || align=left |  || 2561 ||½ ||style="background:black; color:white"|0   ||½   ||style="background:black; color:white"| 1  ||½  ||style="background:black; color:white"|½ ||style="background:black; color:white"|1 || 1 ||  5
|-
| 3 || align=left |  || 2556 || style="background:black; color:white"|½  ||1  ||style="background:black; color:white"|½ || 0 ||style="background:black; color:white"|½  ||½ || 0 ||style="background:black; color:white"|0 || 3
|-
|}

Bracket
Player positions were determined by the October FIDE rating list. No. 1 plays no. 64, 2 plays 63, and so on.

References

External links
Official website
FIDE calendar entry

Women's World Chess Championships
2018 in chess
2018 in Russian women's sport
Chess in Russia
International sports competitions hosted by Russia
Sport in Khanty-Mansiysk
Women's World Chess Championship (tournament)
November 2018 events in Russia